Foolproof Brewing Company (formerly High Jinx Brewing Company) is a brewery based in Pawtucket, Rhode Island.

History
High Jinx Brewing Company was founded in 2012 by Nick Garrison, a former homebrewer from Massachusetts. Shortly after starting operations and before initial sales to the public, it was renamed Foolproof to avoid trademark conflicts with Magic Hat's beer brand, Jinx or Pennsylvania's HiJinx. It brewed its first batch in December 2013 and began in-state sales in January 2013. By the end of 2013 it had doubled its production capacity and expanded distribution to neighboring Massachusetts and Connecticut.

Beers

Foolproof produces limited production seasonal and specialty beers and four year-round beers: Barstool, a golden ale; Raincloud, a porter; La Ferme Urbaine, a farmhouse ale; Backyahd, an IPA which draws its name from the Eastern New England pronunciation of "backyard." The company markets its beers by naming them after "experiences," or common beer-drinking contexts, for which each is intended. Unusual for a small brewery, Foolproof releases most of its beer, and in particular its core year-round brands, in cans, and promotes the use of cans for better flavor. Foolproof's brewmaster, Damase Olsson, is a former chemist and brewer at Nashoba Valley Winery and now-defunct Pennichuck Brewery.

In January 2014 the brewery released a line of beer-based soaps in collaboration with Newport-based soapmaker Spindrift.

See also
 List of breweries in Rhode Island

References

External links
 

2012 establishments in Rhode Island
Beer brewing companies based in Rhode Island
American beer brands
American companies established in 2012
Food and drink companies established in 2012